The Bangladesh Judo Federation is the national federation for judo and is responsible for governing the sport in Bangladesh.

History
The Bangladesh Judo Federation was established in 1972 as the Bangladesh Judo and Karate Federation. In 2001, the Bangladesh Judo and Karate Federation were broken into two, Bangladesh Judo Federation and Bangladesh Karate Federation, by President of Bangladesh Shahabuddin Ahmed and Chief of Bangladesh Army Lieutenant General M Harun-Ar-Rashid. On 14 March 2020, The Japan Judo Federation donated equipment to the Bangladesh Judo Federation.

In 2019, President of Bangladesh Judo Federation, Brigadier General (Rtd) SK Abu Baker bought allegations against the General Secretary AKM Selim. This resulted in an investigation by the National Sports Council.

References

Judo in Bangladesh
National members of the International Judo Federation
1972 establishments in Bangladesh
Sports organizations established in 1972
Judo
Organisations based in Dhaka